Johann Georg Wenrich (13 October 1787, in Schäßburg – 15 May 1847, in Vienna) was an Austrian orientalist and theologian.

He worked as a schoolteacher at the Evangelical gymnasium in Hermannstadt, where he later served as school director. In 1821 he was named professor of Biblical literature at the faculty of Protestant theology at the University of Vienna. He is credited with giving the first lectures on Sanskrit at the university.

In 1847 he was appointed to the Academy of Sciences in Vienna (Kaiserliche Akademie der Wissenschaften in Wien), however, he died on May 15, before he had received news of the honor.

Selected works 
 Johann Wächter, als Mensch, als Diener des Staates und der Kirche (biography of Johann Wächter), (1831). 
 De auctorum Graecorum versionibus et commentariis Syriacis, Arabicis, Armeniacis Persicisque commentatio, (1842).
 De poeseos Hebraicae atque Arabicae origine, indole, mutuoque consensu atque discrimine commentatio, (1843).
 Rerum ab Arabibus in Italia insulisque adjacentibus, Sicilia maxime, Sardinia atque Corsica gestarum commentarii, (1845).

References 

1787 births
1847 deaths
People from Sighișoara
Academic staff of the University of Vienna
Austrian Protestant theologians
Austrian orientalists
Austrian evangelicals